Laplandiya is a rural locality (a railway station) in administrative jurisdiction of Olenegorsk Town with Jurisdictional Territory in Murmansk Oblast, Russia, located beyond the Arctic Circle on the Kola Peninsula at a height of  above sea level. Population: 70 (2010 Census).

References

Notes

Sources

Rural localities in Murmansk Oblast